Evan Crooks is an American actor who was born in Fresno County, California.

Career
Crooks is best known for his performances in A Halloween Puppy (2012), Raised by Wolves (2014), as Theo in the TV series Awkward (2011), and as Miller in The Carrie Diaries. One of his first roles was in a short film called North Blvd, which he reprised years later for a feature film version. He has been featured in commercials for Taco Bell and Coca-Cola, and in print, he has worked with brands including Abercrombie & Fitch, Pottery Barn, Sony and EA Sports.

Filmography

Film

Television

References 

Living people
People from Fresno County, California
American male film actors
American male television actors
Male actors from California
Year of birth missing (living people)